The Chunlan Cup, officially the Chunlan Cup World Professional Weiqi Championship, is an international Go competition.

Outline
The Chunlan Cup is an international Go tournament sponsored and hosted by the Chunlan Group of China. 24 players are chosen as follows:

3 top players of last tournament
8 from 
5 from 
4 from 
2 from 
1 from North America
1 from Europe

The 24 players are reduced to 16 after the first round. The top 8 players are qualified for the next round while the bottom 8 play each other in a knockout tournament.

Each player has 2 hours and 30 minutes of time with five 60-second byoyomi periods, since the 12th cup. (Formerly, the time limit was 3 hours with five 60-second byoyomi periods.) The komi is 7.5 points. The winner's prize is US$150,000.

Past winners and runners-up

By nation

References

External links
 Official website (in Chinese)
 gotoeveryone.k2ss.info

International Go competitions